Argument to moderation—also known as false compromise, argument from middle ground, and the golden mean fallacy—is the fallacy that the truth is supposedly always a compromise between two opposing positions. An example would be to regard two opposed arguments, with one person (correctly) saying that the sky is blue and another saying that the sky is in fact yellow, and incorrectly conclude that the sky is the intermediate colour of green.

See also 

 Centrism
 False balance
 Golden mean (philosophy)
 Horseshoe theory
 View from nowhere
 Wisdom of the crowd

References 

Relevance fallacies